Reznick is a Jewish surname, a variant of Reznik. Notable people with the surname include:

 Bruce Reznick, American mathematician
 Dr. Morgan Reznick, a character on The Good Doctor (TV series)
A spelling variant for David Resnick,  Brazilian-born Israeli architect and town planner 
 Howard Reznick, birth name of Hanon Reznikov, American actor and writer

Yiddish-language surnames